Te Kiato Riwai  (1912–1967) was a New Zealand nurse and māori welfare officer. Of Māori descent, she identified with the Ngāi Tahu iwi. She was born in the Chatham Islands, New Zealand, in 1912.

In the 1965 New Year Honours, Riwai was appointed a Member of the Order of the British Empire, for services as a welfare officer to the Māori people.

References

1912 births
1967 deaths
New Zealand Māori public servants
Ngāi Tahu people
New Zealand Māori nurses
New Zealand recipients of the British Empire Medal
New Zealand Members of the Order of the British Empire
People from the Chatham Islands